Ahuillé is a commune in the Mayenne department in northwestern France.

Population

Notable people
Edward Sorin (1814–1893), priest of the Congregation of Holy Cross

See also
Communes of Mayenne

References

Communes of Mayenne